Luigi Balzarini (29 April 1935 – 12 February 2014) was an Italian footballer, who played as a goalkeeper.

Honours

Club 
Modena
Serie C: 1960–61 (girone A)

References

External links 
Profile at MagliaRossonera.it 

1935 births
2014 deaths
Italian footballers
Serie A players
Association football goalkeepers
Brescia Calcio players
Modena F.C. players
A.C. Milan players
Calcio Lecco 1912 players
Atalanta B.C. players
Piacenza Calcio 1919 players
People from Masera
Footballers from Piedmont
Sportspeople from the Province of Verbano-Cusio-Ossola